Adam Gee is an Australian rugby league referee.

Referee career 
Gee began refereeing in the Canterbury-Bankstown District when he was fourteen. He secured his first A grade appointment in 2004 and controlled two successive A grade Grand Finals in 2004 and 2005. He was graded by the NSWRL Referees Association in 2007.

Gee controlled his first National Rugby League match in 2011 and was established as a regular first grade referee by 2014.

He was announced as one of the match officials at the 2017 Rugby League World Cup, and controlled a match between Papua New Guinea and the United States. He controlled the final of the 2017 Women's Rugby League World Cup.

Gee has also refereed the 2021 and 2022 all stars games. He was in the bunker for the 2023 match

References 

Living people
Australian rugby league referees
National Rugby League referees
Rugby League World Cup referees
1985 births
21st-century Australian people